Balsam Range is a bluegrass and acoustic music group founded in 2007 in Haywood County, North Carolina.  They are the 2014 and 2018 International Bluegrass Music Association (IMBA) Entertainer of the Year recipients. Their other accolades include IBMA Vocal Group of the Year (2014, 2015), Song of the Year (2011, 2015), and Album of the Year (2013, 2017). Balsam Range consists of its original five members - on fiddle and lead vocals, Buddy Melton; on mandolin and vocals, Darren Nicholson; on upright bass, resonator guitar, and vocals, Tim Surrett; on guitar and vocals, Caleb Smith; and on banjo, Marc Pruett.

Members
Buddy Melton (fiddle, vocals) picked up fiddle in college, and is also accomplished on the bass. He performed with Jubal Foster before joining Balsam Range. Buddy has also performed with David Holt and Doc Watson. Melton won the honor of "Male Vocalist of the Year" at the 2014 and 2018 International Bluegrass Music Awards.

Darren Nicholson (mandolin, vocals) has performed many times on the Grand Ole Opry stage, and has toured with The Crowe Brothers and Alecia Nugent among many other artists. He is a Grammy nominee and multiple IBMA award winner. He has released three solo albums, including 2014's Things Left Undone (featuring John Driskell Hopkins and Rhonda Vincent and many others) and 2018's Fret a Spell, a collection of instrumental bluegrass recordings.

Tim Surrett (bass and dobro) has performed with the gospel group The Kingsmen Quartet, winning multiple awards for "Gospel Musician of the Year". He also has a place in the Southern Gospel Hall of Fame. Surrett has also performed with Tony Rice, Ralph Stanley, Brad Paisley, and Vince Gill. In 2014, Surrett won the "Mentor of the Year" award at the IBMA awards for his inspiration and work with young artists.

Caleb Smith (guitar, vocals) performed as a founding member of gospel group Harvest and also won "Male Vocalist of the Year" and "Guitar Player of the Year" for the Power Grass Music Awards. He is also an accomplished luthier, building Smith Custom Guitars for clients such as Zac Brown, Bryan Sutton, and many more.

Marc Pruett (banjo) is a Grammy-winning banjo picker who has played on four albums with Ricky Skaggs, including his first record in 1974 and the 1997 Grammy award winner Bluegrass Rules! He also led the Marc Pruett Band for 10 years. His music was used for over a dozen years in the highly acclaimed outdoor drama Unto These Hills in Cherokee, North Carolina. Dr. Pruett was awarded an honorary doctorate from Western Carolina University in 2010 for his contributions to bluegrass music.

Founding and early years 
"In the beginning, we just got together, five guys from the same county that just wanted to play music together just for the fun of it," said Buddy Melton in a 2018 interview. "We were just living in the same town and happened to be great friends, so it was an ideal scenario." Melton and Pruett had recently performed together as members of Whitewater Bluegrass Company, and band members had recently recorded on each solo efforts by Melton, Nicholson, and Surrett. When the young band gathered to record their first album, they did not yet have a name. Inspiration for a band name came from the Great Balsam Range, a mountain range that surrounds their home county. “We thought it was a little pretentious to have ‘great’ in there, so we just stripped that off of it and called us Balsam Range,” Melton says.  From these initial recording sessions came Marching Home, Balsam Range's debut album, released in October of 2007. The album included guest appearances from Joe Diffie, Doyle Lawson, Jim Van Cleve, Tony Rice, and Jerry Salley, and featured "Blue Mountain", which remains the band's most-requested song.

Albums and achievements
Balsam Range followed up Marching Home with Last Train to Kitty Hawk in 2009, with the title song hitting number one on Bluegrass Unlimited's National Bluegrass Survey in September of that year.Trains I Missed, the title song of their third album, earned Balsam Range their first IBMA Award, Song of the Year, in 2011. Named for their hometown of Canton, North Carolina, which houses a paper mill, Papertown spent five consecutive months at the number-one spot on the Bluegrass Unlimited National Bluegrass Survey chart. The project garnered seven IBMA nominations for Balsam Range in 2013, and they walked away with the Album of the Year honor.

Since 2012, the band has frequently collaborated with John Driskell Hopkins, founding member of the Zac Brown Band. Hopkins heard Balsam Range on bluegrass radio in 2011 and was so impressed, he immediately bought all their music. After making an immediate personal and musical connection upon meeting, they decided to join forces and record an album. In September 2012, Daylight was completed, and officially released in January 2013. Balsam Range recorded and released a limited-run live album, Live at the Altamont, in that same year. This recording was made available only for members of Balsam Nation, the group's fan club.

The 2014 album Five garnered another accolade for the band; its leadoff single, "Moon Over Memphis", was named Song of the Year at the 2015 IBMA awards, where the band also took home the Vocal Group of the Year trophy. Balsam Range's next album, Mountain Voodoo, released in 2016, was named Album of the Year at the 2017 IBMA awards.

Through their work with Hopkins, the band became acquainted with the Atlanta Pops Orchestra, which provided orchestral accompaniment for Balsam Range's next two albums: It's Christmas Time, a 2017 holiday EP, and Mountain Overture, a complete album featuring new versions of Balsam Range's best-loved songs.

Aeonic, released on January 4, 2019, debuted at number one on the Billboard Bluegrass Chart. The album remained on the chart for five consecutive weeks, and appeared on Billboard’s Heatseekers Chart, Americana/Folk Chart, and Current Country Chart. Aeonic was featured in the Wall Street Journal, Rolling Stone Country, Billboard, and more. Also in 2019, Balsam Range released The Gospel Collection, a compilation of gospel recordings from past projects.

Art of Music Festival 
In December 2016, the band introduced the Balsam Range Art of Music Festival, a two-day event held at Lake Junaluska, North Carolina, in the group's home county. The festival, created with the goal of inviting Balsam Range fans from all over the world to visit their home of Western North Carolina, now generates upwards of $400,000 per year in revenue impact for Haywood County. The festival has featured performances by Hopkins, the Atlanta Pops Orchestra, Darrell Scott, Shenandoah, Chloe Agnew, and many more.

Discography
 Marching Home (2007)
 Last Train to Kitty Hawk (2009)
 Trains I Missed (2010)
 Papertown (2012)
 Daylight (with John Driskell Hopkins) (2012)
 Live at the Altamont (2013)
 Five (2014)
 Mountain Voodoo (2016)
 It's Christmas Time (2017)
 Mountain Overture (with the Atlanta Pops Orchestra Ensemble) (2018)
 Aeonic (January 4, 2019)
 The Gospel Collection (2019)
 Moxie and Mettle (2021)

Singles
 "The Girl Who Invented the Wheel" (2018)
 "Hobo Blues" (2018)
" Get Me Gone" (2018)
 "Richest Man" (2020)
 "Grit and Grace" (2020)

References

American bluegrass music groups
Musical groups established in 2007